Gerald Geistweidt (January 20, 1948 – August 13, 2019) was an American politician who served in the Texas House of Representatives from 1979 to 1989.

He died on August 13, 2019, in Mason, Texas at age 71.

References

1948 births
2019 deaths
Republican Party members of the Texas House of Representatives